Shirley Solomon (born  1946) is a Canadian television talk show host.

Career
She hosted The Shirley Show, a daily afternoon talk show on CTV from September 1989 – 1995. Later in its run, it was syndicated to several major-market American television stations, a historic development for a Canadian talk show.

Solomon previously hosted a talk show on The Life Channel, a short-lived Canadian pay television service.

References

Canadian television talk show hosts
1940s births
Living people
Canadian women television personalities